Ubakhea is a former Pomo settlement in Mendocino County, California, and a division of the Pomo people named for the settlement, recorded by George Gibbs in 1851. It was located in southern Mendocino County, near Sanel; its precise location is unknown.

The Ubakhea band of Pomo are one of four bands of Pomo described by Gibbs as living between Sanel and the coast; the other three are Bochheaf, Tabahtea, and Moiya.

References

Former settlements in Mendocino County, California
Former populated places in California
Pomo villages